Sonja Pachta (born 25 April 1941) is an Austrian former tennis player.

Pachta, a 19-time national singles champion, was active on tour from the 1950s through to the 1970s. Between 1963 and 1975 she competed for the Austria Federation Cup team, featuring in 16 rubbers. Her best grand slam performance was a fourth round appearance at the 1962 Wimbledon Championships, where she lost to Billie Jean Moffitt (King).

See also
List of Austria Federation Cup team representatives

References

External links
 
 

1941 births
Living people
Austrian female tennis players